Nina Caroline Studley-Herbert, 12th Countess of Seafield (17 April 1906 – 30 September 1969) was a Scottish peeress.

She was the only child of James Ogilvie-Grant, 11th Earl of Seafield and Ann Nina Ogilvie-Grant. On 24 January 1930, she married Derek Herbert Studley-Herbert. They divorced in 1957. Her former husband died of cancer on 26 March 1960.

She was one of the seven godparents to Antony Armstrong-Jones, 1st Earl of Snowdon, who was christened on 5 April 1930 at the church of the Middle Temple.

The Countess of Seafield was the second richest woman in Britain after the Queen. She died on 30 September 1969 of cancer.

References

1906 births
1969 deaths
Earls of Seafield
Deaths from cancer in the United Kingdom